Thomas William Griffin (January 1857 – April 17, 1933) was a Major League Baseball player. He played eleven games for the Milwaukee Brewers of the Union Association in 1884. Prior to his stint in the UA, he played on Milwaukee's Northwestern League team 
.

Sources

Major League Baseball first basemen
Milwaukee Brewers (UA) players
19th-century baseball players
Baseball players from Pennsylvania
Milwaukee Brewers (minor league) players
1857 births
1933 deaths